The Congregation Montefiore Synagogue is a historic synagogue in downtown Salt Lake City, Utah. The synagogue was built in 1903 for the local congregation of Jews who followed Conservative Judaism. In the 1970s, the congregation merged with Congregation B'nai Israel to form Congregation Kol Ami and the building was sold. Currently the former synagogue houses the Saints Peter and Paul Orthodox Christian Church.

History of the building
The Moorish Revival style synagogue was constructed in 1903. It was built on parcel of land given to the congregation by their fellow congregant Morris Levy. The building cost $9,000, $2,000 of which was donated by the Church of Jesus Christ of Latter-day Saints. Following World War II, an addition was built to house the congregation's school. The building was sold following the congregation's merger with Congregation B'nai Israel. Beginning in the late 1980s Metro-Fellowship, a Christian church affiliated with Assemblies of God, was housed in the former synagogue. Currently the building is home to the Saints Peter and Paul Orthodox Christian Church.

History of Congregation Montefiore
This congregation was formed by a group of conservative Jews who had split in the 1880s from Congregation B'nai Israel (which had adopted practices of Reform Judaism). The new conservative congregation took the name of Montefiore from Moses Montefiore. The congregation joined the conservative Jewish United Synagogue of America network in 1966. In 1972 the congregation re-merged with Congregation B'nai Israel to form Congregation Kol Ami.

See also
B'nai Israel Temple - Synagogue belonging to the first Jewish congregation in the Salt Lake City area.
Congregation Sharey Tzedek Synagogue - Synagogue belonging to the third Jewish congregation in the Salt Lake City area.

References

External links

Saints Peter and Paul Orthodox Christian Church, current occupants of the building.
Congregation Kol Ami

German-Jewish culture in the United States
Synagogues completed in 1890
Synagogues in Salt Lake City
Synagogues on the National Register of Historic Places in Utah
National Register of Historic Places in Salt Lake City
Conservative synagogues in the United States
Former synagogues in the United States
Synagogue buildings with domes